The Sun Odyssey 40 DS (Deck Salon) is a French sailboat that was designed by Daniel Andrieu as a cruiser and for the yacht charter role and was first built in 2000.

The boat uses the same hull design as the Sun Odyssey 40.

Production
The design was built by Jeanneau in France, from 2000 to 2004, with about 300 boats completed, but it is now out of production.

Design
The Sun Odyssey 40 DS is a recreational keelboat, built predominantly of fiberglass, with wood trim. It has a masthead sloop rig, with a deck-stepped mast, two sets of swept spreaders and aluminum spars with stainless steel wire rigging. The hull has a raked stem, a reverse transom with a swimming platform, an internally mounted spade-type rudder controlled by a single wheel and a fixed "L"-shaped fin keel with a weighted bulb or optional shoal-draft keel. The fin keel model displaces  and carries  of cast iron ballast, while the shoal draft version displaces  and carries  of cast iron ballast.

The boat was built with three different interior layouts: a two-cabin, three cabin with one head and three-cabin with two heads. A typical three-cabin layout has sleeping accommodation for six people, with a double "V"-berth in the bow cabin, a "U"-shaped settee and two seats in the main cabin and two aft cabins, each with a double berth. The two-cabin layout omits the aft starboard cabin. The galley is located on the starboard side at the companionway ladder. The galley is "L"-shaped and is equipped with a two-burner stove, an ice box and a double sink. There are two heads, one just aft of the bow cabin on the starboard side and one on the port side in the aft cabin.

Operational history
In a 2000 review naval architect Robert Perry wrote, "The interior in plan form is conventional with a double berth forward, double quarter berth aft and two heads. There is the option of a single quarter berth to starboard just aft of the galley. It's a comfortable-looking layout that, from what I can see in the drawings, does not have a chart table. The small seats with table to port could work well as a nav station. The conventional interior is encapsulated in an unconventional deck. If you find the large, raised cabinhouse awkward to the eye, hold judgment until you step below and see the benefits of this wraparound, glass-type house. I'm not crazy about stocky-looking cabinhouses, but I think the light and visibility below will make up for the challenging aesthetics ... There are two cockpits available. You can have the cockpit with the wheel mounted catamaran- and powerboat-style on the aft face of the cabintrunk, or you can go with a pedestal-type wheel in the center of the cockpit. The advantage of the bulkhead-mounted wheel is that this leaves the rest of the cockpit wide open. With the wheel forward, the helmsman will also get some protection from the raised cabinhouse. Given the performance look of this hull, I would prefer to sail this boat from a wheel aft so that I could move from side to side depending upon which tack I was on."

See also
List of sailing boat types

References

External links

Keelboats
2000s sailboat type designs
Sailing yachts
Sailboat type designs by Daniel Andrieu
Sailboat types built by Jeanneau